Sri Susuhunan Pakubuwono XIII (Javanese script: ꦯꦩ꧀ꦥꦺꦪꦤ꧀ꦢꦊꦩ꧀ꦲꦶꦁꦏꦁꦯꦶꦤꦸꦲꦸꦤ꧀ꦑꦁꦗꦼꦁꦯꦸꦱꦸꦲꦸꦤꦤ꧀ꦦꦏꦸꦧꦸꦮꦤ XIII; born in Surakarta, June 28, 1948) has been the king of the Surakarta Sunanate since 2004. The title Pakubuwono XIII was initially claimed by two of the sons of the former king, Pakubuwono XII, Hangabehi and Tedjowulan, after their father's death.  The problem of succession arose because the sons had been born to different mothers but Pakubuwono XII had never formally appointed a queen consort. The oldest son, Kanjeng Gusti Pangeran Haryo Hangabehi, was appointed by the royal family as the court's ruler. (Kanjeng Gusti Pangeran Haryo is a Javanese regnal title, often abbreviated KGPH.)  The younger son, KGPH Tedjowulan, then declared a walkout from the palace.  Both sons subsequently claimed the title and each separately held a funeral for their father. However, family consensus recognized KGPH Hangabehi as SISKS Pakubuwono XIII.

On July 18 – 19, 2009, there was a ceremony in the kraton where the enthronement anniversary was conducted with the sacred Bedoyo Dance performed especially for the ceremony. Attendees included various local and foreign dignitaries as well as Hangabehi's half-brother Tedjowulan. In 2012 the disagreement about the kingship in the Sunanate of Surakarta was resolved after KGPH Tedjowulan acknowledged his half-brother as Pakubuwono XIII in an official reconciliation event initiated by Surakarta city government with the support of the national People's Representative Council.  KGPH Tedjowulan himself became a mahapatih (viceregent) styled Kangjeng Gusti Pangeran Haryo Panembahan Agung.

Early life 
KGPH Hangabehi is the eldest son of Pakubuwono XII and his wife, Kanjeng Raden Ayu Pradoponingroem. His original name was Gusti Raden Mas Surjadi. As he was a sickly boy, his paternal grandmother, Gusti Kanjeng Ratu Pakubuwono, rechristened him GRM Surjo Partono, a title which was recognised by the Javanese  community in accordance with Javanese spiritual advice. In 1979, paugeran (cultural custom) determined that he should bear the name Kangjeng Gusti Pangeran Haryo Hangabehi.  This implied that as the eldest prince, he was being prepared as the future heir.

In official matters KGPH Hangabehi became pangageng (official) of the Keraton museum and took charge of numerous other important affairs. He was also awarded the 1st Sri Kabadya Star by Pakubuwono XII for his service in overcoming the great fire in the Surakarta Palace in 1985. KGPH Hangabehi was the only one of Pakubuwono XII's children to be awarded such a decoration. Other than some awards from several national and international institutions, KGPH Hangabehi has also received an honorary degree from  the Global University for Lifelong Learning (GULL), United States. His daily hobbies are no different from those of non-royal members. KGPH Hangabehi, other than playing the keyboard and riding supercharged motorcycles, is active in the Organisasi Amatir Radio Indonesia.

Two claimants 
Upon the death of Pakubuwono XII in 2004, there was no clear heir to the throne because no official queen had ever been installed.  The two half-brothers who are sons of Pakubuwono XII, Hangabehi and Tedjuwulan, had different mothers and both claimed the throne.

On August 31, 2004, the younger son KGPH Tedjowulan was crowned by some of his siblings in the Sasana Purnama residence.  However, a meeting of Pakubuwono XII's children held earlier on July 10, 2004, had determined that the eldest prince, Hangabehi should be the next king and that his coronation would be held on September 10, 2004. In early September 2004, Tedjowulan and some of his followers made a sudden attack and battered the palace gates, causing some injuries to noblemen and court servants.   The chairman of the Surakarta Palace Legal Institution, Kanjeng Pangeran Edy Wirabumi, reported details of the attack to the Surakarta Police.  He noted that there had been destruction of cultural items in the vicinity of the court.

Some days later, on September 10, 2004, three of the court's elders -- Gusti Pangeran Haryo Mataram, Bendoro Kanjeng Pangeran Haryo Prabuwinoto, and Gusti Raden Ayu Brotodiningrat -- gave their blessing to Hangabehi as Pangeran Adipati Anom (crown prince) in the Surakarta Palace, lending legitimacy to Hangabehi's claim to be the new ruler of Surakarta.

Resolution 
A reconciliation between KGPH Hangabehi and KGPH Tejowulan took place in 2012 at the initiative of the then-Mayor of Surakarta, Joko Widodo. A reconciliation signing was held in national Parliament House at Senayan in Jakarta, on June 4, 2012. The reconciliation was witnessed by various dignitaries including the  Chair of People's Representative Council (DPR) Marzuki Alie, the Chairs of the 2nd, 4th, and 9th Committees of the DPR, representatives of the Ministries of Public Works, Home Affairs, Tourism and Creative Economy, the Governor of Central Java Bibit Waluyo, and the Mayor of Surakarta Joko Widodo.  It had been agreed that KGPH Tedjowulan would relinquish the title of Pakubuwana XIII and that he would be granted title Kangjeng Gusti Pangeran Haryo Panembahan Agung.  The title Pakubuwana XIII was conferred solely on KGPH Hangabeh. During the 8th ceremony of the Tingalandalem Jumenengan (coronation) on June 15, 2012, KGPH Tedjowulan was officially invited to attend the ceremony and he performed a traditional sungkem (kneeling) in front of Pakubuwono XIII as sign of respect.

However there was often still friction between the separate groups within the Surakarta palace.  Incidents in 2014 and 2016 indicated continuing problems.  In 2017, it appeared that an important step had been taken to resolve the on-going disagreements within the royal families. In late April, Susuhunan Pakubuwono XIII Hangabehi was formally crowned at a large ceremony in the Surakarta Palace. The event was attended by hundreds of invitees, including Minister of Home Affairs Tjahjo Kumolo, Central Java Governor Ganjar Pranowo, Surakarta Mayor F. X. Hadi Rudyatmo and Soedjiatmi Notomihardjo, the mother of the President of Indonesia, Joko "Jokowi" Widodo.

Family

Marriage
Pakubuwono XIII has married three times:
 RAy. Nuk Kusumaningdyah/KRAy. Endang Kusumaningdyah (divorced)
 Winarsih Sri Harjani/KRAy. Winarti (divorced)
 Asih Winarni/KRAy. Pradoponingsih/GKR. Pakubuwono (queen consort)

Sons
 GRM. Suryo Suharto/KGPH. Mangkubumi/KGPH. Hangabehi
 GRM. Suryo Aryo Mustiko/KGPH. Purboyo

Daughters
 GKR. Timoer Rumbai Kusuma Dewayani
 GRAy. Devi Lelyana Dewi
 GRAy. Dewi Ratih Widyasari
 BRAy. Sugih Oceania (Almarhum)
 GRAy. Putri Purnaningrum

Grandchildren
 BRM. Pramuditho Adiwiwoho
 BRA. Shayna Lelyana Sriro
 BRM. Noah Satrio Sriro
 BRM. Yudhistira Rachmat Saputro
 BRM. Hersar Dewa

References

Susuhunan of Surakarta
Living people
1948 births
Indonesian royalty